Opsies capra is a species of beetle in the family Cerambycidae, and the only species in the genus Opsies. It was described by Pascoe in 1864.

References

Morimopsini
Beetles described in 1864